OJSC Dalsvyaz is a telecommunications service provider active in the Russian Far East.  It is part of Svyazinvest Holdings, which is Russia's largest telecommunications holding company, and which owns many large regional telecommunications service providers in Russia.

Operations
The company is active in the following federal subjects:
Amur Oblast
Jewish Autonomous Oblast
Kamchatka Krai
Magadan Oblast
Primorsky Krai 
Sakhalin Oblast
Khabarovsk Krai

Related organizations
Dalvyaz owns a significant amount of the stock of the following companies:

KamAlascom Joint Venture LLC – Long-distance network between the Kamchatka region and the state of Alaska, USA
MagAlascom Joint Venture LLC – Long Distance network between the Magadan region and the state of Alaska, USA
CJSC TeleRoss-Vladivostok – Agency services
CJSC Transicom, Bogoyavlensky Aleksey Gennadievich – Trunk communication
Interdaltelecom LLC – Local telecommunication services in Vladivostok
Besprovodniye Informatsionniye Sistemy" (Wireless information technologies) LLC – Cellular network services
Integrator.ru CJSC – Investment activities 
CJSC AKOS – Cellular network services 92,26%
Sakhalinugol’ Telecom CJSC – Local telephone service and internet service provider on Sakhalin Island

See also
CenterTelecom
North-West Telecom
Sibirtelecom
Southern Telecom
Uralsviazinform
VolgaTelecom
Rostelecom

External links
OJSC Dalvyaz in Russian and in English
Svyaz'invest – Russian language and English language

Cable television companies of Russia
Svyazinvest
Companies based in Vladivostok
Russian brands
Companies formerly listed on the Moscow Exchange
Defunct companies of Russia